Bapen may be,

Bapen Township, China
Bapen language, Senegal